Loïc Kervella (born 2 November 1993) is a French slalom canoeist who has competed at the international level since 2011.

He won a gold medal in the C2 team event at the 2015 ICF Canoe Slalom World Championships in London.

His partner in the C2 boat is Yves Prigent.

World Cup individual podiums

References

External links 

Loic KERVELLA at CanoeSlalom.net

French male canoeists
Living people
1993 births
Medalists at the ICF Canoe Slalom World Championships